Edward Rich, 8th Baron Rich, 6th Earl of Warwick and 3rd Earl of Holland (1673 – 31 July 1701), of Holland House, Kensington, Middlesex, was an English peer and member of the House of Lords, styled Lord Rich until 1675.

Origins
He was the son and heir of Robert Rich, 5th Earl of Warwick, 2nd Earl of Holland (1620–1675).

Career
In 1675 he succeeded his father to the titles. In 1699, together with his friend Charles Mohun, 4th Baron Mohun, Warwick was tried for the murder of Richard Coote and was found guilty of manslaughter. He escaped punishment by pleading the privilege of peerage. He and Mohun had killed Coote in a duel and it was common for a seventeenth-century jury in such cases to take a lenient view of such matters.

Marriage and children
In early 1697 he married Charlotte Myddelton, a daughter of Sir Thomas Myddelton, 2nd Baronet, by whom he had one son:
Edward Rich, 7th Earl of Warwick (1698–1721)

Charlotte, who survived her husband, was later married to the celebrated writer Joseph Addison.

Death and burial
He died in 1701 and was succeeded by his son Edward Rich, 7th Earl of Warwick (1698–1721).

Ancestry

References

1673 births
1701 deaths
17th-century English nobility
18th-century English nobility
Earls of Warwick (1618 creation)
Edward
Earls of Holland
English people convicted of manslaughter